__notoc__

An OH/IR star is an asymptotic giant branch (AGB) or a red supergiant or hypergiant (RSG or RHG) star that shows strong OH maser emission and is unusually bright at near-infrared wavelengths.

In the very late stages of AGB evolution, a star develops a super-wind with extreme mass loss.  The gas in the stellar wind condenses as it cools away from the star, forming molecules such as water (H2O) and silicon monoxide (SiO). This can form grains of dust, mostly silicates, which obscure the star at shorter wavelengths, leading to a strong infrared source. Hydroxyl (OH) radicals can be produced by photodissociation or collisional dissociation.

H2O and OH can both be pumped to produce maser emission. OH masers in particular can give rise to a powerful maser action at 1612 MHz and this is regarded as a defining feature of the OH/IR stars.  Many other AGB stars such as Mira variables show weaker OH masers at other wavelengths, such as 1667MHz or 22MHz.

Examples

OH/IR stars

 R Aquilae
 QX Puppis
 WX Piscium
 V437 Scuti
 V669 Cassiopeiae
 W43A
 NSV 25875
 V1300 Aquilae
 V1366 Aquilae
 V1365 Aquilae
 GX Monocerotis
 IW Hydrae
 SY Aquilae

OH/IR supergiants

 S Persei
 AH Scorpii
 MY Cephei
 IRC -30308
 PZ Cassiopeiae
 VX Sagittarii
 NML Cygni
 VY Canis Majoris
 IRC +10420

Notes

References

Stellar evolution
 
 
 
Star types